Sutton-under-Whitestonecliffe is a village and civil parish in the Hambleton district of North Yorkshire, England. Historically part of the North Riding of Yorkshire, it is situated on the A170 at the foot of Sutton Bank, about three miles east of Thirsk.

History

The village is mentioned in the Domesday Book as Sudtune in the Yarlestre hundred. The manor was recorded as in the possession of Orm, son of Gamal, but was granted to Hugh, son of Baldric after the Norman invasion.

Governance

The village lies within the Thirsk and Malton UK Parliament constituency. It is part of the Thirsk electoral division of North Yorkshire County Council and the Bagby & Thorntons ward of Hambleton District Council. The population of this ward taken at the 2011 census was 1,863.

The local Parish Council has six members including the chair.

Geography

The village lies to the west of the limestone escarpment of Sutton Bank. The nearest settlements are Thirlby  to the north; Bagby  to the south west and Cold Kirby  to the east. The low level geology of the area is of Devensian clay on beds of lower Jurassic lias. There is a small waterway, Sutton Beck, that is part of the tributary system that joins the River Swale near Topcliffe.

According to the 2001 UK Census the population was 268 of which 230 were over the age of sixteen and 149 of those were in employment. There were 143 dwellings of which 89 were detached.

The village holds the distinction of being the longest hyphenated place name in England with 29 characters.

Notable buildings

There are 11 Grade II Listed Buildings in or near the village, including two mileposts, the former post office and village store and the former Methodist church. The list also includes Sutton Hall which was built in the 18th century and was the seat of the Smyth family until 1766. It is now used as timeshare holiday flats.

References

External links

Villages in North Yorkshire
Civil parishes in North Yorkshire